Chahar Bagh (also Romanized as Chahār Bāgh; also known as Chahanāgh) is a village in Firuzeh Rural District, in the Central District of Firuzeh County, Razavi Khorasan Province, Iran. At the 2006 census, its population was 226, in 56 families.

References 

Populated places in Firuzeh County